Normal Field may refer to:

Normal Field (Arizona), a former field of the Arizona State Sun Devils
Normal Park, a former field of the Chicago Cardinals